The 1962 Quebec general election was held on November 14, 1962, to elect members of the Legislative Assembly of the Province of Quebec, Canada.  The incumbent Quebec Liberal Party, led by Jean Lesage, was re-elected, defeating the Union Nationale (UN) led by Daniel Johnson, Sr.

In an unusual move, the election was called just two years after the previous 1960 general election. Lesage sought a mandate for the Nationalization of the electricity industry, with the slogan Maîtres chez nous (Masters in Our Own Home), declaring it a single issue important enough to stake his political career on it.

A few days before the election, the Union Nationale'''s chief organizer André Lagarde was arrested for fraud. The Liberals claimed this was proof of lingering corruption dating from the Maurice Duplessis era, but the UN cried foul and was vindicated after the election. However, the incident may well have contributed to the UN's defeat.

The Liberal Party won an increased number of seats and a higher percentage of the popular vote, and the nationalization program was carried out. Future Parti Québécois'' founder René Lévesque served as a cabinet minister in the Lesage government and spearheaded the nationalization of power utilities for a great expansion of Hydro-Québec.

Results

See also
 List of Quebec premiers
 Politics of Quebec
 Timeline of Quebec history
 List of Quebec political parties
 Quiet Revolution
 27th Legislative Assembly of Quebec

Further reading

External links
 CBC TV video clip

Quebec general election
Elections in Quebec
General election
Quebec general election